Gümüşhanespor is a Turkish sports club based in Gümüşhane. The football team currently plays in the TFF Third League.

References

External links
Official website
Gümüşhanespor on TFF.org

 
Association football clubs established in 1995
Football clubs in Turkey
1995 establishments in Turkey